Akiko C. Bedor Sugiyama is a Palauan politician, and widow of Palauan senator Peter Sugiyama. As late as 1995, she was the only woman who had ever been elected to the Palau National Congress. In 2005, she was elected governor of Ngardmau State in a special election after the impeachment of Schwartz Tudong over the misuse of public funds. Along with Vicky Kanai of Airai, she was the first woman to be elected governor of any of the states of Palau.

References

Year of birth missing (living people)
Members of the House of Delegates of Palau
People from Ngardmau
Living people
20th-century Palauan women politicians
20th-century Palauan politicians
21st-century Palauan women politicians
21st-century Palauan politicians